Ghazaryan, or the Western Armenian variant Ghazarian, is an Armenian surname meaning "descendant of Ghazar", the Armenian equivalent of Lazarus. It may refer to:

Ghazaryan
Armen Ghazaryan (born 1982), Armenian and Russian weightlifter
Arman Ghazaryan (born 2001), Armenian footballer
Gevorg Ghazaryan (born 1988), Armenian footballer
Hayk Ghazaryan (1930–2014), Armenian historian and professor
Manvel Ghazaryan (born 1961), Armenian politician
Mekhak Ghazaryan (born 1966), Soviet and Armenian boxer
Rafael Ghazaryan (1924–2007), Armenian radio-physicist, academician and public activist
Regina Ghazaryan (1915–1999), Armenian painter and public figure
Stepan Ghazaryan (born 1985), Armenian footballer who plays goalkeeper for FC Banants
Taguhi Ghazaryan (born 1991), Armenian Member of Parliament
Vardan Ghazaryan (born 1969), Lebanese-Armenian football (soccer) player

Ghazarian
Armenak Ghazarian (1864–1904), commonly known as Hrayr Dzhoghk, Armenian military leader, fedayee in the Ottoman Empire
Hazel Ghazarian Skaggs (1920–2005) American author and composer
Kevork Ghazarian (1870–1907), commonly known as Kevork Chavush or Gevorg Chaush, Armenian military leader, fedayee in the Ottoman Empire
Sona Ghazarian (born 1945), Armenian-Austrian operatic soprano singer

See also
Ghazi (disambiguation)
Aga Zaryan
Gazeran
Hazaran
Khazaran

Armenian-language surnames